Luguan Town is an urban town in and subdivision of Xinhua County, Hunan Province, People's Republic of China.

Administrative division
The town is divided into 60 villages and three communities, the following areas: 
 
 Luguang Community
 Lukuangyisanjing Community
 Lukuangerjing Community
 Bijia Village
 Xiniu Village
 Suyuan Village
 Luguan Village
 Shiping Village
 Hengling Village
 Shantang Village
 Bai'e Village
 Sili Village
 Changsheng Village
 Changtian Village
 Tiaoshi Village
 Shixi Village
 Shiyan Village
 Longshan Village
 Changtang Village
 Qiangxiang Village
 Qingjiashan Village
 Daxin Village
 Qinggang Village
 Taiyangqiao Village
 Kouqian Village
 Yantang'ao Village
 Yuegong Village
 Shajinglong Village
 Renqutang Village
 Pingjiang Village
 Jiulong Village
 Nongke Village
 Langshan Village
 Yunxi Village
 Wanshouqiao Village
 Qingshui Village
 Yanshan Village
 Hejia Village
 Xiaotian Village
 Zhongtian Village
 Shuangjiang Village
 Zhixi Village
 Lijiawan Village
 Xiaojinxi Village
 Linchong Village
 Hengshanxi Village
 Jin'e Village
 Leixi Village
 Jiuping Village
 Jiangkou Village
 Xinrong Village
 Meishu Village
 Xinghua Village
 Maociyuan Village
 Tianxin Village
 Putao Village
 Shixin Village
 Sanjiang Village
 Jintan Village
 Jinjun Village
 Longzhua Village
 Yongxing Village
 Heye Village

References

External links

Divisions of Xinhua County